McMillan Flowage  is a lake of Victoria County, in north-eastern Nova Scotia, Canada.It was created when the Nova Scotia Power Corporation constructed the Wreck Cove Hydro Electric Station and placed D-7 Dam across Indian Brook.

See also
List of lakes in Nova Scotia

References
 National Resources Canada

Lakes of Nova Scotia